John Newell may refer to:

 John Newell (baseball) (1868–1919), Major League Baseball infielder
 John Newell (Canadian politician) (born 1935), member of the Nova Scotia House of Assembly
 John Newell (North Carolina politician), state legislator in North Carolina
 John Newell (Queensland politician) (1849–1932), member of the Queensland Legislative Assembly